The 1953 Yugoslav Constitutional Law was a big packet of constitutional amendments to the 1946 Yugoslav Constitution, with the goal of introducing the idea of self-management in the constitutional matter of the Federal People's Republic of Yugoslavia. It came into effect on January 13, 1953. The amended 1946 constitution would remain in power until the adoption of the 1963 Yugoslav Constitution.

This packet of constitutional amendments was approved at the sixth congress of the League of Communists of Yugoslavia. It partially separated party and state political functions and granted some civil and political rights to individuals and constituent republics. It further established legal foundations for workers' control over enterprises and expanded local governmental power. It established the Federal People's Assembly with two houses: a Federal Chamber, directly representing the regions, and a Chamber of Producers, representing economic enterprises and worker groups. The executive branch of the federal government (Federal Executive Council or FEC) included only the five ministries dealing with national affairs and foreign policy. The League of Communists retained exclusive political control, based on the Leninist credo that the state bureaucracy would wither away, and that a multiparty system would only bring more cumbersome bureaucratic institutions.

Regulations 
On the basis of the political and social order, social ownership on the means of production, self-producers in the economy, self-management of working people in the municipality, the city and the county and self-working people in the fields of education, culture and social services was declared.

Yugoslavia was proclaimed a socialist, democratic, federal state of sovereign and equal nations. All power in the country belonged to the working people through their representatives in the various bodies, as well as directly - election, revocation of representatives, assemblies, councils and other forms of self-government, which was declared a basis for the entire organization.

In the field of the representative body this was reflected in the introduction of the Council of Producers, as the home of the representatives of professions, in addition to a political home. The dichotomous principle of separation of powers was abandoned, and the Federal National Assembly was proclaimed the supreme representative of people's sovereignty and the highest authority of the federation.

Until then, the highest existing executive body, the Presidium of the National Assembly of FNRJ and the Government of FNRJ were replaced with two executive authorities of the Federal People's Assembly - the President of the Republic and the Federal Executive Council (known as FEC), who were responsible for the assembly work, at least on paper. President of the Republic was also the president of the Federal Executive Council.

Democratic centralism was also abandoned, the rights of the republics and autonomous regions were increased, and in the municipality, the city and the county self-management was introduced.

References

Yugoslavia
Yugoslav law
1953 in Yugoslavia
1953 documents
January 1953 events in Europe
1953 in politics
1953 in law